Beijing No. 4 High School, commonly abbreviated as (Beijing) Sizhong, and sometimes referred to as Beijing High School Four (BHSF), is a public beacon high school in Xicheng District, Beijing. It is one of the most prestigious high schools in China. It was established in 1907 as the Shuntian Secondary School, and was later renamed Capital Public No. 4 Secondary School. It took its current name in 1949. The school was among the first to be accredited as a "Municipal Model High School" by the Beijing Municipal Commission of Education. More than 96 percent of its graduates passed the enrollment line of key universities (Tier 1 schools) in National Higher Education Entrance Examination. In a 2016 ranking of Chinese high schools that send students to study in American universities, Beijing No. 4 High School ranked number one in mainland China in terms of the number of students entering top American universities, and number four internationally for high schools outside of the United States. James Palmer of Foreign Policy described it as "the rough equivalent of Eton". Many Chinese politicians and their children have attended Beijing No. 4.

History

Qing Dynasty period
Beijing No. 4 High School is one of the oldest schools in Beijing. Its predecessor Shuntian Secondary School (顺天中学堂) was founded in 1906 by the Shuntian Government. Along with a few other primary and secondary schools established, the Qing government nullified the imperial examination system and commenced a more institutional system on academic studies and education as a result of the Hundred Days' Reform.

Republic of China period

During the Republic of China (ROC) period, the Capital Department of Education Affairs (京师学务局) exercised jurisdiction over the school and renamed it Capital Public No. 4 Secondary School (京师公立第四中学) on September 29, 1912, which is thus the anniversary commemorated until today.

The May Fourth Movement of 1919 involved representative students from the school to parade and assemble at Tiananmen. After the city was invaded in 1939 by Japan, the school was mandated to conduct education of enslavement by Japan. The surrender of Japan in 1945 ended enslaved education, and the ROC government took over, with Sun Lubin (孙鹿宾) being principal. At that time, the secret service of the Chinese Communist Party (CCP) had been developing secret CCP members within the school.

In 1945, alumni from Tsinghua University, Yenching University and Peiyang University who argued against the Chinese Civil War propagated their ideas to Senior Grade 3 students in an auditorium in the Beijing No.4 High School. When the local police arrived and besieged the auditorium, a conflict with the students broke out, with several students injured by bayonet. The police then bound the alumni. The Mayor of Peking, He Siyuan, dispatched personnel to unbind them and apologized to the students.

From late 1948 to early 1949, the school was forced to cease its teaching and suspend classes when the Kuomintang army occupied the school, turned its buildings and campus into barracks to fight against CCP in the Chinese Civil War.

Post 1949 period

The Communist Party assumed control of the city on January 31, 1949. On March 15, the Beijing Military Management Commission (北京市军管会) sent Li Fusheng (李复生) to take over the school as principal. In April 1949, it set a Youth League branch and a Communist Party branch, and established a students union. It was at this time that the school was renamed to Beijing No.4 High School (北京市第四中学).

The Department of International Students was established in 2002. Since then, international students from at least 25 countries including Korea, Japan, New Zealand, Australia and Canada started to enroll in Beijing No.4 High School.
 
The International Olympic Committee (IOC) sent an evaluating delegation to inspect Beijing in February 2001. The No.4 High School was the only educational organ that received the evaluating committee. It was believed to have contributed to the success of Beijing in the 2008 Summer Olympics bidding.

On August 6, 2007, IOC President Jacques Rogge visited the school and delivered a speech there.

CCP General Secretary and PRC President Jiang Zemin paid a visit to the school on November 7, 1995. Chinese Premier Wen Jiabao visited the school on September 4, 2007, and expressed his wish for the school to become a world class one.

On August 7, 2008, the day before the opening ceremony of the Olympic Games, the school was visited by the wife of IOC President Jacques Rogge, Anne Rogge and other foreign guests.

On May 5, 2011, NBA player Roy Hibbert of Indiana Pacers visited the school as a part of the NBA Cares program. Roy Hibbert taught students some basketball tactics and skills.

Main Campus 

The Main Campus of BHSF is located within the area of Imperial City of old Beijing. It serves as the home of the BHSF's senior high school programs.

Old campus

Historically, Shun Tian Secondary School (顺天中学堂) was situated in Wanping Senior Primary School (宛平高等小学堂) Capital Houku (京师后库) (Houku, Xicheng District, Beijing). The very old campus had been renovated and rebuilt many times, while the site was not changed. It occupied 65,733 m², of which the playground occupied 27,067 m², including basketball courts, tennis courts, football pitch, and volleyball courts. On the campus, there were around 1,500 trees and flowers in approximately 100 kinds. It also had a botanical garden where crops grown and a well pavilion.

Current campus

The school was refurbished in 1983 and it was shrunk to an area of 4.26 hectares. The new campus was designed by architect Huang Hui.

Main Building
This four story building contains mostly classrooms, which are shaped in hexagons instead of rectangles. The design considerations include making the students feel less crowded and allowing the students at the side to view the blackboard with a smaller angle.

Other buildings

The old principal's office (老校长室) is built in the style of ancient Chinese architectures.  The 6-floor Technology Building has laboratories for chemistry, physics, biology, and computer sciences. On the sixth floor, there is an observatory for astronomy clubs. The Administration Building, built in 2007, has offices for teachers and staff and conference or meeting rooms, as well as a cafeteria and an auditorium.
A build for music and art classes, a small clinic and dormitories can also be found on campus. The library  holds roughly 170,000 books, 400 types of journals and magazines, 40 newspaper collections, 8000 optical discs and 2000 recording tapes.

The school has a standard 400-meter running track, with two volleyball courts, six basketball courts and various gymnastic and other track and field facilities. There's also an indoor gymnasium and a  swimming pool. Rooms for martial arts, ballet dance, table tennis and other sports are also found on campus.

The corridor from Main Building to Technology Building is one of the more notable characteristics in Beijing No.4 High School.

Branch Campuses

Junior High Campus
The Junior High Campus (or Beihai Park Campus) is located several blocks away from the Main Campus. It is adjacent to Beihai Park. It used to be the site of Beihai Middle School, which merged with Beijing No.4 High School in 2005.

International Campus
International Campus (or Business Street Campus) of Beijing No.4 High School (commonly abbreviated as BHSFIC) has been the home of BHSF's oversea classes since 2012. It is a small campus located on the Business Street of Xicheng District, Beijing. Students of this campus are registered as a part of the student body of Main Campus. There is a 3-year AP Program available at this campus. Most students who graduate from this campus attend colleges abroad.

Shunyi Campus
Shunyi Campus is a branch school of Beijing No.4 High School located in Shunyi, a district of Beijing. It has a huge campus (230 acres) and runs both junior and senior high school programs. Usually, however, this school is only considered as an affiliated school to BHSF administrated by the same school officials. Students there are not usually considered as a part of the student body of Main Campus, for their admission requirements and scores are different from those in Main Campus.

Fangshan Campus
Opened in 2014, the Fangshan Campus is the newest campus of Beijing No.4 High School. It is located in Fangshan, a satellite town outside of central Beijing. Buildings and facilities in this campus are totally environmental friendly. Similar to the Shunyi Campus, Fangshan Campus is usually considered as an affiliated school to BHSF.

Hohhot Campus
The Hohhot Campus of Beijing No.4 High School is the only BHSF branch campus that is not in Beijing Municipality. Instead, it is in the city of Hohhot, the capital of Inner Mongolia. It is a high school ran by the local government of Hohhot but working on a very deep integration with Beijing No.4 High School. This campus opened in 2012, and it became one of the best and most reputable high schools in Inner Mongolia only after two years.

Beijing No.4 Online School
Beijing No.4 Online School is a distance education platform of Beijing No.4 High School. It combines technology and education resources which connect teachers and students in No. 4 High School and others elsewhere. Beijing No.4 Online School offers countrywide online courses to students in elementary schools and high schools. It is an open platform with rich resources.

Administration

Academic Departments
Literature
Mathematics
English
Physics
Chemistry
History
Geography
Politics (Politics, Economics and Philosophy)
Arts (Music and Fine Arts)
Biology
Engineering
Academic Affairs
Teaching and Researching
Student Departments
Grades and Classroom Groups
Student Regular Management
Morality Office
Student Government
Student TV Channel
Residential Halls
Health Departments
Physical Education
Health Center
High School Varsity Teams 
Sport Facilities
Media Departments
Media Technology
Computer Sciences
Internet Development
General Service Offices
Finance and Bureau
Library
General Management
Supporting
Dining Hall
Telephone and Communication
Administration Offices
Registration
Document
School History Exhibition
Security
Drivers
Alumni Association
Oversea Class and Office
School Property Management
Civil Construction
Affiliated Parts
Swimming Instruction
Souvenirs Store
Digital Resource
Extracurricular Institute
International Center
Online Program

Academic and student lives

Academic
Beijing No.4 High School is one of the top Chinese high schools with stellar reputation on academics. It is one of the first schools in China that offers different mathematics and English classes to different students according to their academic performances. In International Science Olympiad, students from this school have won 7 gold medals, 3 silver medals and 1 bronze medal. The school also has talent program called Daoyuan class.

Beijing No.4 High School is known for its high average score in National Higher Education Entrance Examinations. Its average score is higher than most other high schools in Beijing. Every year, about forty percent of students from this high school could be admitted by Peking University and Tsinghua University, the two best universities in China. A larger portion of students will attend other highly ranked institutes including schools in the elite C9 League. Some students will be accepted by top institutes in Hong Kong as well as highly reputable and ranked universities or liberal art colleges in the United States, Canada and Europe.

Required and elective courses
All students are required to take all core courses of 14 subjects, including Chinese Literature, Mathematics, Chemistry, Physics, Biology, English, History, Political Sciences, Geography, Musicology, Fine Arts, Basic Engineering Skills, Computer Science and Physical Education. In the second year of senior high school, students will be divided into two groups based on their interests and career plans. Liberal-arts oriented students need to complete more courses in history, politics (including Philosophy, Economics and Political Sciences) and geography, while science-and-engineering oriented students need to take more credits in mathematics, biology, chemistry and physics. Besides, one research project is required for each academic year, and additional required internships or volunteer activities should be completed. Specifically, all students have to pass the swimming-skill test before graduation. Training and exercises in military, agriculture and business are usually required.

In addition to those required courses, students need to take one elective course every semester. Topics of those elective courses vary widely, including but not limited to film study, classical music, history of World War II, poetry, fashion design, photographing, industrial engineering, programming, 3D cartoon design, interior design, cooking, ancient Chinese, quantum physics, psychology, historical geography, GIS, mineralogy, guitar performance, harmonica, French language, mass media, economics, modeling and dissection.

Physical Education and athletes
Beijing No.4 High School regards Physical Education as one of the most important part of high school curriculum. From the first day of class till the day before graduation, it requires all students to take at least one hour PE class every day. The winter-day long-distance race is a tradition of this school. The PE classes are also divided into required ones and elective ones. The required classes are gymnastic, track and field, martial arts, basketball, swimming and sports theories; elective courses include upper levels of previous ones and soccer, volleyball, table tennis, baseball, fitness and Bridge Card. Noticeably, as mentioned above, all students must pass swimming test before graduation. During the three-year period, most students are also required to take part in a 2-week military training and several field trips and field trainings to build up their perseverance, confidence, leadership and teamwork skills.

Beijing No.4 High School has several varsity teams including soccer, basketball, swimming and martial arts. The basketball program at this high school is a powerhouse and they have won the championship of national high school basketball tournaments 4 times since 1998.

Organizations
Up to 2013, there are 24 student organizations at Beijing No.4 High School with various focuses, including:
 Archaeology Society
 Hip-Pop Society
 Ballet Society
 The Society of Debate
 The Club of Sciences and Technology
 Literature Society
 Orchestra (Now chamber music club)
 Drama Society
 The Choir
 Philanthropy Society
 Rock music society
 Astronomy Society
 The Society of Chinese Classics
 The IC A Capella Group
 Model United Nations
 Club of history book reading
 Basketball team
 Martial Arts team
 Hockey team
 Club of Kickboxing
 Society of cards and chess
 Marketing Educational Series for Entrepreneurs program
 Society of psychology
 literature society LiuShi流石文学社

Culture

Facts

The calligraphic title Beijing Sizhong (北京四中, literally Beijing No.4 High School ) was inscribed by Guo Moruo.
The school emblem features the Old Gate built in 1929.
The school anthem Song of Hope and Ideal is composed by composer Shi Guangnan.
On every May Fourth Day's night, there are Evening Parties of Lights on campus. 
On every late of December, there are Dancing Parties on campus as celebration for the New Year. Every students have to find their own partners and dressed up to come to the party.
The old version of school uniform has a nickname Penguin, for it has white background with dark-blue sleeves which make it looks like a penguin. However, the old version of school uniform was replaced by Japanese and Korean styled new version in 2010.

Wang Daoyuan's admonishment
Wang Daoyuan was the first principal of Beijing No.4 High School. His admonishment to first students is curved on a glacial gravel and placed on campus:

Sister schools
  Berkshire Eton College
  London Westminster School
  Chicago Walter Payton College Prep
  Texas St. John's School
  California Sonoma Academy
  Utah Park City High School
  Singapore NUS High School
  Christchurch Christchurch Boys' High School
  Seoul Seoul Science High School
  Taipei Taipei First Girls' High School
  Taipei Taipei Municipal Jianguo High School
  Taichung Ming-Dao High School
  Taipei Taipei Municipal Zhongshan Girls High School
  Taipei Taipei Wego Private Senior High School
  Dublin Blackrock College

Notable alumni

Science and Technology
 Fang Lizhi, an astrophysicist and prominent dissident.
 Feng Yuanzheng, a scientist and professor at California Institute of Technology, regarded as the founding figure of bioengineering, tissue engineering, and the "Founder of Modern Biomechanics"
 Yu Fuchun, the former chair and professor at Department of Physics at Peking University.
 Tu Chuanyi, a Chinese Academy of Sciences academician in earth and spatial sciences. Professor at Peking University.
 Zhang Zhaoxi, a Chinese Academy of Sciences academician in physics.
 Shi Yaolin, a Chinese Academy of Sciences academician in earth sciences; professor at University of the Chinese Academy of Sciences
 Hao Bolin, a Chinese Academy of Sciences academician in physics.
 Hu Peicheng, a psychologist and professor at Peking University
 Mao Erke, a scientist in radar and information technology. Professor at Beijing Institute of Technology.
 Ding Weiyue, a Chinese Academy of Sciences academician in math. Professor at Peking University.
 Wang Zhuang, vice chief designer of Shenzhou Spaceship.
 Zhong Binglin, former president of Beijing Normal University; professor in mechanical engineering at Southeast University
 Wang Chongyu, a Chinese Academy of Sciences academician in physics. A professor at Tsinghua University.
 Ding Guoyu, a famous scholar in geology and geophysics. Chinese Academy of Sciences academician.
 Wang Wencai, a Chinese Academy of Sciences academician in biology.
 Liu Guangzhi, a mining technician at Chinese Academy of Engineering
 Wang Chengmin, a geoscientist and seismologist, formerly at China Earthquake Administration
 Ma Wenyuan, a mathematician and professor at Beijing Normal University
 Wu Yansheng, a rocket designer; president of China Academy of Launch Vehicle Technology
 Chen Shihua, an engineer in water conservancy and professor at Tongji University and Peking University
 Li Yupei, a mathematician and professor at Capital Normal University, known as a popular science writer
 Xia Zhengkai, a geologist, geographer and professor at Peking University
Wang Siyuan, a biologist and professor at Yale School of Medicine

Humanities and Social Sciences 
 Li Ao, a Taiwanese writer, social commentator, historian, and independent politician
 Wang Meng, a writer; previously the vise president of Ministry of Culture of the People's Republic of China
 Bei Dao, a prominent Misty Poet and a dissident. 
 Feng Zhi, a poet and writer
 Ngapoi Jigme, former president at Radio Free Asia
 Yu Dan, known for her popular retelling of Confucianism and other ancient Chinese philosophies.    
 Zhou Xiaozheng, a famous socialist and professor at Renmin University
 Li Yiyun, a writer and professor at University of California, Davis.
 Cong Weixi, a famous writer
 Shen Zhihua, a historian researching on cold war; a professor at East China Normal University and a guest lecturer at Chinese University of Hong Kong.
 Zhang Shunjiang, the very first Chinese professor in sciences of decision making. Professor at University of Science and Technology of China. Visiting professor at New York University.
 Fu Yang, the vice chair of All China Lawyers Association
 Li Qiang, professor and chair of School of Social Sciences at Tsinghua University. Visiting scholar at Bristol University and University of Michigan.
 Dai Shihe, a painter; the chair of the Department of Oil Painting at China Central Academy of Fine Arts
Zhang Taisu, a professor at Yale Law School
 He Fangchuan, a historian and professor at Peking University
 Li Qiang, a scholar in social science and professor at Tsinghua University
 Zhang Xiaoshan, the director of Rural Area Development programs at Chinese Academy of Social Sciences

Politics and Military 
 Yu Zhengsheng, a politician; former member of Politburo Standing Committee of the Chinese Communist Party
 Liu Yushan,  a politician; the Secretary-General of the Executive Yuan in 2005-2007.
 Bo Xilai, a former Chinese politician; On 22 September 2013, Bo was found guilty of corruption, stripped of all his assets, and sentenced to life imprisonment.
 Ma Kai, a politician, formerly a State Councilor and Secretary General of the State Council of China
 Ling Qing, former Permanent Representative of China to the United Nations (1980-1985)
 Wang Kunlun, a Chinese politician and co-founder of the Revolutionary Committee of the Kuomintang
 Liu Yuan, a Chinese politician and serviceman; previously the vise commander of Chengdu Military Region
 Lin Liguo, the person in charge of Project 571 Outline; son of Lin Biao
 Qiao Zonghuai, former vice president of Ministry of Foreign Affairs in China
 Jiang Xiaoyu, previously represented in Chinese People's Political Consultative Conference
 Chen Yuan, the former Vice Chairperson of the Chinese People's Political Consultative Conference; Head of China Development Bank
 Luo Shiqian, the former Party Secretary of Shanghai
Zhang Xuesong, Deputy Chief of the Intellectual Property Division of Beijing Municipal High People's Court
 He Pengfei, Lieutenant general of the Navy in the People's Liberation Army; son of He Long
 Chen Haosu, former chairman of the Chinese People's Association for Friendship with Foreign Countries
 Tao Xiping, member of National People's Congress Education, Science, Culture and Public Health Committee
 Nie Dajiang, president of Lanzhou University; former vice chief minister in Publicity Department of the Chinese Communist Party
Geng Shuang, a politician, formerly the deputy director of the Foreign Ministry Information Department of China
Xu Xiaoyan, Lieutenant general of the People's Liberation Army, official in the Joint Staff Department of the Central Military Commission
Yang Dongming, Lieutenant general of the People's Liberation Army Air Force
Sun Yinbai, a celebrated translator with the Flying Tigers during the World War II

Arts and Sports 
 Xie Fei, a film director; notable films include Black Snow and Woman Sesame Oil Maker.
 Chen Kaige, a film director; notable films include Farewell My Concubine, Together, The Promise and Caught in the Web.
 Teng Huatao, a film director; notable films include Naked Wedding, Chow Through Pain and Dwelling Narrowness 
 Gao Xiaosong, a songwriter, musician, and talk show host
 Zhang Lu, a famous soccer game commentator. Vise chair of board at Beijing Guoan F.C.
 Shu Chang, an actress who played roles in Xiaozhuang Mishi, The Story of a Noble Family, Huang Taizi Mishi, Lian Cheng Jue, Demi-Gods and Semi-Devils and Royal Tramp.
 Liu Yushan, an artist; chief editor at Central Fine Arts Publishing House
 Han Maofu, international referee of basketball
Wu Jing, an actor who played roles in the Wolf Warrior series, The Sacrifice, The Climbers, and The Wandering Earth
 Wang Weiguo, an actor and winner of Plum Blossom Prize
Ya Ning, a TV host in China Central Television

Business 
 Yu Xiaoyi, financial analyst, and investment banker turned venture capitalist
 Kong Dan, an entrepreneur and economist; president of China Everbright Group.
 Qin Xiao, president of China Merchants Bank

See also
Beacon high schools in Beijing
List of schools in Xicheng District

References

External links

 Official web site

Educational institutions established in 1907
High schools in Beijing
1907 establishments in China
Schools in Xicheng District